Jana rustica is a moth in the  family Eupterotidae. It was described by Embrik Strand in 1911. It is found in Tanzania.

References

Janinae
Moths described in 1911